is a fictional character in the One Piece franchise created by Eiichiro Oda. She is based on Ann and Silk, two characters from Oda's previous manga Romance Dawn. She is introduced as a thief and pickpocket who possesses cartographical, meteorological, and navigational skills. At first, she is a subordinate of the fishman Arlong, but she is eventually freed of this service and permanently joins Monkey D. Luffy to fulfill her dream of creating a complete map of the world.

In the series, Nami is the Straw Hat Pirates' navigator, who dreams of drawing a map of the entire world. Despite her initial distrust of pirates, Nami eventually changes her mind after being around Luffy and the rest of the crew. Nami is depicted as an intelligent girl who is obsessed with obtaining money. She is able to use her three-sectioned staff and her climate skills to create powerful attacks; the most prominent of these staff weapons is the Clima-Tact, in which she manipulates the climate to create weather-based attacks.

Conception and creation

Nami was based on two of Eiichiro Oda's earlier characters named Silk and Ann, from his one-shot manga Romance Dawn. In these stories, Silk and Ann were parentless and had tragic pasts. Oda designed Nami as a human girl. At first, Oda wanted Nami to use a large axe, but he replaced it with a pole-based weapon. In an early concept of the Straw Hats, Nami was the only woman on the crew.

Nami is fashionable and her style changes throughout One Piece. She was first introduced wearing a white-and-blue striped shirt, an orange mini-skirt and orange boots. Throughout the series, Nami is commonly seen wearing a shirt or bikini top, a skirt and high-heeled sandals. Nami often wears blue tattoos throughout the course of the series; the first is a symbol of Arlong's crew which is later removed and replaced with a symbol of a tangerine and pinwheel on her left bicep. Eventually, Nami starts wearing earrings and has her hair, once just barely shoulder-length, grown down to the middle of her back, while usually wearing bikini tops with blue jeans. Concerning her ethnic appearance, Oda revealed that he imagines Nami to be of Swedish nationality, albeit in a real-world context.

Voice actresses

In the Japanese version of the entire One Piece anime series, and later spin-offs, Nami has been voiced by Akemi Okamura. In 2001, Okamura temporarily left the series due to her pregnancy; Wakana Yamazaki acted as a substitute for episodes 70-78. In the OVA Defeat the Pirate Ganzack!, Nami was voiced by Megumi Toyoguchi. In 4Kids Entertainment’s dub of the anime, Nami is voiced by Kerry Williams. In Funimation Entertainment's dub of the anime, Nami is voiced by Luci Christian.

Characteristics
Nami possesses several abilities. She can tell climate changes and draw sea charts. She is also a pickpocket.

Eventually, Nami adds the Sorcery Clima-Tact (Sorcery Climate Baton in the Viz manga and Funimation subs) with Weatheria's technology, which not only has improved abilities, but can also be used for other uses such as producing Milky Clouds for riding across. As with her original staff, these three weapons are also tri-sectional. Later, Usopp gives Nami an improved Sorcery Clima-Tact model she wanted him to make (which he had Franky help him a little bit). Using the knowledge he acquired over the time-skip with the plant-based Pop Greens, Usopp combined this with the Weatheria technology Nami provided him and designed the new Sorcery Clima-Tact to be smaller and more compact than the previous models. Instead, it uses the Pop Greens' growth abilities for the staff to extend and contract, through the use of squeezing or releasing the handle. This improvement also allows Nami to now be able to directly attack with her staff from a distance. Nami later teamed up with Big Mom's thundercloud-based accomplice Zeus, eventually forcing him to become her servant, and is currently part of her arsenal, now living inside her Clima-Tact. Though Zeus' body was later destroyed by his former master, his soul was able to survive and has now completely merged with the Clima-Tact, improving its capabilities and giving it shape-changing abilities, such as transforming it into a mace.

Appearances

In One Piece
Nami first appears in the manga chapter , first published in Japan's Weekly Shōnen Jump magazine on September 22, 1997. She first appears as a thief who robs treasure from pirates, and partners with Luffy and Zoro after joining forces to obtain a map of the Grand Line from the clown-like pirate Buggy. As the crew defends the seafaring restaurant Baratie from Don Krieg's pirates, Nami learns of a bounty on the fish-man pirate Arlong and departs with the crew's ship and accumulated treasure, intending to buy back her home village Cocoyashi from Arlong's control.

The crew learns of Nami's past from her adoptive sister Nojiko: Nami and Nojiko were orphaned infants rescued from a war-torn kingdom and adopted by the Marine Bellemere, who raised them as her own. As a child, Nami developed a love for cartography and navigation, dreaming of creating a map of the entire world. One day, Arlong and his crew invaded Cocoyashi and demanded a monetary tribute from the villagers. Bellemere used her entire remaining fortune to spare Nami and Nojiko, and was killed by Arlong to set an example for the villagers. Arlong then kidnapped Nami upon discovering her talent for cartography and forced her to chart maps for him, while promising that the village would be freed for a price. Nami was driven for the following eight years to rob from pirates in order to buy back her village. When Nami's loot is confiscated by a corrupt Marine, she learns that Arlong has been bribing the Navy into ignoring his crimes, and she begs Luffy for help in her despair. Luffy and the others successfully defeat Arlong, freeing the village as a result. Nami rejoins the crew as they sail off to the Grand Line to pursue their dreams.

At Whiskey Peak, the crew is entrusted to escort the princess Nefertari Vivi to her kingdom Alabasta. While fending off pursuers of Vivi on Little Garden, Nami is bitten by a poisonous tick and falls ill. She is treated and cured on Drum Island, where the medic Tony Tony Chopper joins the crew. In an effort to better protect Vivi, Nami requests a weapon – the Clima-Tact – from the crew's sniper Usopp, which she uses (with some initial difficulty) to defeat Miss Doublefinger in Alabasta. When the crew rescues their archaeologist Nico Robin at Enies Lobby, Nami receives a bounty along with the rest of the crew. In Thriller Bark, Nami is kidnapped by the zombie Absalom, who tries to force her to marry him. The crew's cook Sanji tries to rescue her, but Absalom incapacitates him and attempts to complete the wedding. Nami is saved by the zombie Lola, who later gives Nami her mother's Vivre Card, a piece of paper representing the owner's soul. While attempting to reach Fish-Man Island, the crew meets the mermaid Camie and rescues her friend, who turns out to be Hatchan, a former member of Arlong's crew. While Nami does not yet completely forgive Hatchan for his previous association, she appreciates his takoyaki.

After being separated from the crew by Bartholomew Kuma, Nami ends up on the floating island Weatheria, where she masters the meteorological arts. Two years later, Nami reunites with Luffy and the others and they head to Fish-Man Island. Reuniting with Camie, the crew is invited to King Neptune's palace. There, they encounter a new crew of fish-man pirates led by Hody Jones, who has inherited Arlong's will. Nami and Camie escape to the Sea Forest, where they meet Jimbei, a fish-man pirate who formerly served as a World Government Warlord and released Arlong into the East Blue. Nami comforts Jimbei after he tells the history of discrimination rooted into Fish-Man Island and expresses his guilt over Arlong. At Jimbei's request, Nami steals a letter in Hody's possession, and engages with the New Fish-Man Pirates. When the crew travels to Punk Hazard, Nami, Sanji, Chopper, and the crew's shipwright Franky are abducted by Caesar Clown, and they decide to rescue the children being used in Caesar's experiments. Upon escaping the laboratory, they encounter the World Government Warlord Trafalgar Law, whose ability swaps Nami's mind into Franky's body. When Luffy and Law form an alliance, Law swaps Nami's mind into Sanji's body (as Nami's body is not present) when attempting to return the crew members to normal. While rescuing the children from Caesar, Nami regroups with the crew and is returned to her own body. She later prevents Caesar's escape with Usopp's help, and she entrusts the children with the Marine Tashigi.

In Dressrosa, Nami stays on the Thousand Sunny with Chopper and the crew's musician Brook to guard Caesar and the ship. They are attacked by Giolla of the Donquixote Pirates and turned into abstract art, but Brook defeats Giolla and returns them to normal. Due to the Big Mom Pirates also targeting Caesar, Nami and half of the crew are forced to head to Zou to avoid creating more problems for the Dressrosa mission. Following the Dressrosa incident, her bounty increases along with those of the rest of the crew. In Zou, the group rescues Tristan, a member of the Mink Tribe, from Sheepshead of the Beast Pirates. Upon discovering the Mink Tribe's devastation caused by Caesar's poison gas weapon, Nami's group decides to come to the Minks' aid and rescue them. The grateful Minks thank Nami as a benefactor, and she exchanges clothes with the tribeswoman Wanda as a customary token of friendship. Two days before Luffy and the rest of the crew arrive at Zou, Nami's group is detained by Capone Bege of the Big Mom Pirates, but Sanji's quick wit spares them as he is taken away. When Luffy arrives, Nami explains what had happened on Zou. Taking responsibility for Sanji's capture, she accompanies Luffy as the crew leaves for Whole Cake Island to rescue Sanji.

While trekking through Whole Cake Island's Seducing Woods, Nami's group is attacked by Big Mom's children Brulee and Cracker as well as the "homies", a race of animals, plants and objects granted sentience. Nami learns that Big Mom is Lola's mother, and that the homies will not attack as long as she carries Big Mom's Vivre Card. Nami uses this advantage to support Luffy, and she creates rainclouds that weaken Cracker's "Biscuit Soldiers". Following Cracker's defeat, Luffy and Nami reunite with Sanji and try to bring him back, but Sanji hides his situation and repels them. The pair are defeated by Cracker's avenging army, robbed of the Vivre Card (which Nami had split in two in advance), and imprisoned in Mont-d'Or's book. Before Nami can be tortured by Opera for Lola's whereabouts, she and Luffy are rescued by Jimbei. They then join up with Chopper and others to go into the Mirro-World and rescue Brook, who was captured by Big Mom. After receiving Luffy's decision to rescue Sanji's family, Nami joins forces with Capone Bege's operation to assassinate Big Mom. On the day of Sanji's arranged wedding, she infiltrates the venue as Luffy throws it into chaos and assists in rescuing the Vinsmoke family. When the assassination attempt fails, Nami is caught by Smoothie while attempting to retreat into Capone Bege's body, but is rescued by Sanji's sister Reiju. After escaping from Big Mom's collapsing castle, Nami wields the Vivre Card and pits the homies Kingbaum and Zeus against the pursuing Big Mom. She promises to meet Luffy — who has taken refuge in the Mirro-World — on Cacao Island at a later time. In the battle with Big Mom, who has boarded the Thousand Sunny, Nami works with Brook to capture Big Mom's homie Zeus and make him Nami's servant.

Just before arriving in Wano, the Thousand Sunny is caught in a violent whirlpool, during which Nami is carried by Sanji to safety. They subsequently reunite with Luffy at the ruins of Oden Castle, where the samurai Kin'emon discusses a decisive battle against the Beast Pirates, led by Kaido. Nami is entrusted with her role in the operation as the kunoichi "Onami". Together with Shinobu, she travels to the Flower Capital and obtains information on the distribution of weapons. When Nico Robin is called to Orochi's castle, Nami infiltrates it as an escort and attacks Orochi, allowing her and Robin to escape. The next day, after hiding out in a cemetery, she is discovered in a bathhouse by the Beast Pirate Hawkins, but is rescued by Sanji and escapes to Ebisu Town. Following a ruckus in Rasetsu Town, Nami receives a final message by Yasuie from Bepo. She delivers it to Kin'emon, and goes to Amigasa Village to prepare for a raid on Onigashima. During the raid, Nami is spotted by the homie Prometheus, who contacts Big Mom. Nami loses control of Zeus, but is rescued by Franky and Brook. Within Kaido's stronghold, Nami and Usopp provoke and attract the attention of Beast Pirates Ulti and Page One, and are nearly killed. With Tama's intervention, they barely manage to escape, and use Tama's power to turn the Beast Pirates' elite soldiers into allies. While continuing to flee from Ulti and Page One, Nami and Usopp encounter Big Mom, who angrily joins Nami in attacking Ulti for harming Tama. Big Mom resumes her pursuit of Nami and Usopp when Ulti is momentarily knocked out. After Zeus is forsaken by Big Mom, he integrates with Nami's Clima-Tact, becoming Nami's partner. She and Usopp escape Big Mom after the pirate Eustass Kid ambushes her, and they finally defeat Ulti with the aid of Nami's newly-powered weapon.

In other media

Nami has made several appearances in other media, including, but not limited to, every One Piece licensed electronic video game to date, including Jump Super Stars and Jump Ultimate Stars. In 2006, she is featured in the Dragon Ball/One Piece/Naruto crossover game Battle Stadium D.O.N.. In addition to her in-game appearances, Nami has also been featured and mentioned in some songs. "Music" features Nami singing about herself listening to music while chasing her dreams. "Between the Wind" features Nami singing about weather and drawing sea charts.

Nami will be portrayed by Emily Rudd in Netflix’s live action adaptation of One Piece.

Reception
Nami ranked in the Top 10 of all three Shōnen Jump character popularity polls. Her backstory has been found to be a "touching story" as it "unfolds with a lot of emotion" by Mania Entertainment writer, Jarred Pine. Pine also mentioned Nami was his favorite character from the series, and satisfied with how the manga showed her past. While reviewing the eighth DVD from Viz Media, Activeanime mentioned Nami is one of the best characters from the series as "She’s got guts, smarts, and can heft a mean punch when needed". Like Pined, Activeanime liked Nami's background and added that his "itty bitty heart went out to her". Nami was ranked as #28 in a survey conducted by Newtype Japan for Favorite Anime Heroine in 2002. In the SPJA 2008, Nami was nominated in the category "Best Female Character".

References

External links 

 Nami's bio at One Pieces official website

Further reading

Adoptee characters in anime and manga
Comics characters introduced in 1997
Female characters in anime and manga
Fictional cartographers
Fictional meteorologists
Fictional navigators
Fictional sea pirates
Fictional female pirates
Fictional professional thieves
Fictional characters with electric or magnetic abilities
One Piece characters
Orphan characters in anime and manga
Teenage characters in anime and manga
Fictional characters with weather abilities
Fictional orphans